Wesley John Correira Jr. (born November 11, 1978), nicknamed Cabbage, is an American mixed martial artist who competes in the heavyweight and super heavyweight divisions. An iron chinned brawler, Correira began his career in 2000 and came to prominence with a number of knockout wins on the heavyweight scene in his native Hawaii before a two-year stint in the Ultimate Fighting Championship between 2002 and 2004. Following this, he became a journeyman heavyweight, fighting a number of notable opponents mostly in his native state.

Early life
Wesley Correira trained in Boxing, Judo (earning a Brown Belt), Karate and Wrestling during high school, and eventually made the jump to Mixed Martial Arts. He went on to train with Egan Inoue, B.J. Penn and Falaniko Vitale. He earned the nickname "Cabbage" as a child due to his resemblance to the Cabbage Patch Kids.

Career
Correira debuted on July 22, 2000, at the Rings USA: Rising Stars Block B regional qualifying tournament in Honolulu, Hawaii, losing to Eric Pele by submission due to an armbar in round two of their semi-final bout. After joining the SuperBrawl promotion, he would then lose to Travis Fulton by the same method three months later and Preston Hartzog by split decision a month after that. Having begun his career with three consecutive losses, he won his first fight with a disqualification victory over Marcelo Tigre at SuperBrawl 21 on May 24, 2001, before a string of three technical knockout wins brought his record into the winning margin.

In late April 2002, Cabbage was invited to compete in the SuperBrawl 24: Return of the Heavyweights tournament held over two consecutive days in Honolulu. He TKO'd Kevin Jordan in the tournament's first round and caused Travis Wiuff to tap with knee strikes in the quarter-finals but was unable to fight in the semis due to an injury sustained. When a knockout of Kauai Kupihea the following month improved his record to 7-3 with six knockouts, he was signed by the Ultimate Fighting Championship and debuted against Tim Sylvia, the man who won the SuperBrawl tournament, at UFC 39 in Uncasville, Connecticut on September 27, 2002. The bout was the "Fight of the Night" as Correira took everything Sylvia could dish out for the first round. Cabbage's corner threw in the towel nearly two minutes into the second round after he took too much abuse. As he took such a heavy beating without ever being knocked down, commentator Mike Goldberg exclaimed during the fight "this man is not human!". In fact, during the seven minutes the fight lasted, Correira absorbed the highest number of power strikes ever recorded in one fight in UFC history.

After returning to Hawaii and taking two KO wins over Jason Lambert and Joe Riggs before the end of 2002, he made his way back to the UFC to face Sean Alvarez at UFC 42 in Miami, Florida on April 25, 2003. A noted grappler, Alvarez was unable to take Correira down for much of the fight. After he finally got the takedown, Alvarez was too tired to be able to control Correira, who made his way back to his feet and TKO'd him with punches and knees in round two. After another two fight stint on the Hawaiian circuit, a split decision win over Justin Eilers and TKO of Steve Sayegh, Cabbage took on fellow brawler Tank Abbott at UFC 45 in Uncasville on November 21, 2003. He dropped Tank a couple of time early in the fight and opened a cut, which caused the ringside doctor to stop the fight and give Correira the TKO victory. Immediately after the stoppage, Cabbage did his trademark "Cabbage Patch dance" and then gave Abbot the finger which set off a mini riot as John Marsh, Eddie Ruiz and other members of Abbott's posse mixed with Chuck Liddell and others who came to break up the conflict.

In his final UFC appearance, Cabbage was TKO'd by Andrei Arlovski in round two at UFC 47 in Las Vegas, Nevada on April 2, 2004. He then lost on points to John Marsh and Yoshihiro Nakao in the Rumble on the Rock promotion in his next two outings before bouncing back with a first-round KO of Walt Pels at WEC 14 in Lemoore, California on March 17, 2005. A rematch between Correira and Tank Abbott went down at Rumble on the Rock 7 in Honolulu on May 7, 2005, and Abbott got his revenge when he became the first man to knock Cabbage unconscious, doing so in the first round.

He ventured into the world of kickboxing when he was recruited by K-1 to fight in the K-1 World Grand Prix 2005 in Hawaii on July 29, 2005. Paired with fellow MMA slugger and eventual tournament champion Gary Goodridge in the quarter-finals, Correira went out as is typical of MMA fighters trying their hand at kickboxing; he was chopped down with low kicks in round one. Returning to MMA, he took three straight wins by first round stoppage before falling to Eric "Butterbean" Esch via TKO due to a broken arm at Rumble on the Rock 8 in Honolulu on January 20, 2006, in a fight which took place under special rules, ground fighting being limited to fifteen seconds per instance regardless of the situation. This triggered a run of defeats as Cabbage was submitted with a Kimura by Kazuhiro Hamanaka at Rumble on the Rock 9 on April 21, 2006, and then stopped via cut by debuting professional wrestler Mike Polchlopek at Rumble on the Rock: Beatdown 1 on June 17, 2006.

Cabbage was scheduled to fight Ruben Villareal at Strikeforce: Tank vs. Buentello in Fresno, California on October 7, 2006, but withdrew due to medical reasons. Another bout that fell through was a proposed fight with Tengiz Tedoradze at Cage Rage 19: Fearless in London, England on December 9, 2006.

He lost to Antônio Silva by first-round TKO in the co-main event of EliteXC: Destiny in Southaven, Mississippi on February 10, 2007. After surviving an early onslaught of ground-and-pound, Cabbage made his way back to his feet but was floored with a flying knee and followed up on with punches. This loss effectively resigned Correira to journeyman status.

His anticipated Cage Rage debut was moved back to Cage Rage 22: Hard As Hell on July 14, 2007, where he was set to face James Thompson but once again it fell through as he was replaced by Neil Grove.

Wesley Correira made his second foray into the kickboxing ring at the K-1 World Grand Prix 2008 in Hawaii on August 9, 2008, where a rematch with Eric Esch awaited him at the quarter-final stage. He spent four months practicing Muay Thai in Bangkok, Thailand before the tournament and his training paid off as he finished Butterbean with a high kick in round two to secure a place in the semis. There, he was initially set to face Mighty Mo but he was injured and replaced by Randy Kim. Cabbage's inability to check kicks was once again his downfall as he was knocked down twice and stopped with kicks to the lead leg in the second round.

Although this would be his last appearance in a ring or cage for almost five years, a match with Lion's Den fighter Buddy Roberts was penciled in for February 13, 2009, on a WarGods/Ken Shamrock Productions co-promoted event, Valentine's Day Massacre. Correira backed out of the fight an hour beforehand after he learned the promotion would be cutting his fight purse in half to cover last-minute costs for his state-required medical tests. Further controversy arose when he tested positive for marijuana in a pre-fight drug test. While anyone with above 50 ng/mL of the drug in their system is considered "a truely [sic] active user", Cabbage registered a staggering 700 ng/mL. He was suspended for six months and fined $1,000 by the California State Athletic Commission.

Correira made his comeback to the cage on January 19, 2013, at Rumble World Entertainment: Just Scrap 19 in his hometown of Hilo, Hawaii, losing to Deutsch Pu'u by TKO in round one. He then earned his first MMA win in five years and his first proper submission victory when he tapped Paea Paongo with a Kimura in the second round of the Rumble World Entertainment: Just Scrap Maui 4 main event in Maui, Hawaii.

Legal issues
On May 11, 2011, Correira was arrested on charges of burglary and theft.

Kickboxing record

|-
|-  bgcolor="#FFBBBB"
| 2008-08-09 || Loss ||align=left| Randy Kim || K-1 World Grand Prix 2008 in Hawaii, Semi Finals || Honolulu, Hawaii, USA || KO (left low kick) || 2 || 1:00 || 1-2
|-
|-  bgcolor="#CCFFCC"
| 2008-08-09 || Win ||align=left| Eric Esch || K-1 World Grand Prix 2008 in Hawaii, Quarter Finals || Honolulu, Hawaii, USA || TKO (left high kick) || 2 || 0:53 || 1-1
|-
|-  bgcolor="#FFBBBB"
| 2005-07-29 || Loss ||align=left| Gary Goodridge || K-1 World Grand Prix 2005 in Hawaii, Quarter Finals || Honolulu, Hawaii, USA || TKO (right low kick) || 1 || 2:43 || 0-1
|-
|-
| colspan=9 | Legend:

Championship and Accomplishments
Icon Sport
Icon Sport Heavyweight Championship (1 Time, First, Last)

Mixed martial arts record

|-
| Loss
| align=center| 21–16
| Daniel Spitz
| Decision (unanimous)
| RWE: Just Scrap
| 
| align=center| 3
| align=center| 5:00
| Hilo, Hawaii, United States
|
|-
| Win
| align=center| 21–15
| Matt Kovacs
| TKO (punches)
| RWE: Just Scrap
| 
| align=center| 1
| align=center| 0:52
| Hilo, Hawaii, United States
|
|-
| Win
| align=center| 20–15
| Paea Paongo
| Submission (kimura)
| RWE: Just Scrap Maui IV
| 
| align=center| 2
| align=center| 1:55
| Maui, Hawaii, United States
|
|-
| Loss
| align=center| 19–15
| Deutsch Pu'u
| TKO (punches)
| RWE: Just Scrap 19
| 
| align=center| 1
| align=center| 0:43
| Hilo, Hawaii, United States
| 
|-
| Loss
| align=center| 19–14
| Jeff Ford
| TKO (punches)
| Worldwide Fighting Championship: Armageddon
| 
| align=center| 1
| align=center| 4:59
| Denver, Colorado, United States
| 
|-
| Win
| align=center| 19–13
| Jacob Faagai
| TKO (shoulder injury)
| X-1: Events-Champions
| 
| align=center| 1
| align=center| 2:17
| Honolulu, Hawaii, United States
| 
|-
| Loss
| align=center| 18–13
| Chris Marez
| Decision (unanimous)
| X-1: Extreme Fighting 2
| 
| align=center| 3
| align=center| 5:00
| Honolulu, Hawaii, United States
| 
|-
| Loss
| align=center| 18–12
| Antônio Silva
| TKO (flying knee and punches)
| EliteXC: Destiny
| 
| align=center| 1
| align=center| 3:49
| Southaven, Mississippi, United States
| 
|-
| Win
| align=center| 18–11
| Kim Ji-Hoon
| TKO
| Pacific Xtreme Combat 8: Terror Dome
| 
| align=center| 1
| align=center| 2:07
| Mangilao, Guam
| 
|-
| Loss
| align=center| 17–11
| Mike Polchlopek
| TKO (cut)
| Rumble on the Rock: Beatdown 1
| 
| align=center| 1
| align=center| 1:46
| Hawaii, United States
| 
|-
| Loss
| align=center| 17–10
| Kazuhiro Hamanaka
| Submission (kimura)
| Rumble on the Rock 9
| 
| align=center| 2
| align=center| 1:53
| Honolulu, Hawaii, United States
| 
|-
| Loss
| align=center| 17–9
| Butterbean
| TKO (doctor stoppage)
| Rumble on the Rock 8
| 
| align=center| 2
| align=center| 5:00
| Honolulu, Hawaii, United States
| 
|-
| Win
| align=center| 17–8
| Manny Chong
| TKO
| Fury Full Contact Fighting 4: Collision
| 
| align=center| 1
| align=center| 1:50
| Guam
| 
|-
| Win
| align=center| 16–8
| Junior Sua
| Submission (position)
| Rumble on the Rock: Just Scrap
| 
| align=center| 1
| align=center| 1:21
| Hilo, Hawaii, United States
| 
|-
| Win
| align=center| 15–8
| Lloyd Marshbanks
| TKO
| Rumble on the Rock: Showdown in Maui
| 
| align=center| 1
| align=center| 3:16
| Maui, Hawaii, United States
| 
|-
| Loss
| align=center| 14–8
| Tank Abbott
| KO (punch)
| Rumble on the Rock 7
| 
| align=center| 1
| align=center| 1:23
| Honolulu, Hawaii, United States
| 
|-
| Win
| align=center| 14–7
| Walt Pels
| KO (punches)
| WEC 14: Vengeance
| 
| align=center| 1
| align=center| 0:23
| Lemoore, California, United States
| 
|-
| Loss
| align=center| 13–7
| Yoshihiro Nakao
| Decision (split)
| Rumble on the Rock 6
| 
| align=center| 3
| align=center| 5:00
| Honolulu, Hawaii, United States
| 
|-
| Loss
| align=center| 13–6
| John Marsh
| Decision (unanimous)
| Rumble on the Rock 5
| 
| align=center| 3
| align=center| 5:00
| Honolulu, Hawaii, United States
| 
|-
| Loss
| align=center| 13–5
| Andrei Arlovski
| TKO (punches)
| UFC 47
| 
| align=center| 2
| align=center| 1:15
| Las Vegas, Nevada, United States
| 
|-
| Win
| align=center| 13–4
| Tank Abbott
| TKO (cut)
| UFC 45
| 
| align=center| 1
| align=center| 2:14
| Uncasville, Connecticut, United States
| 
|-
| Win
| align=center| 12–4
| Steve Sayegh
| TKO (punches)
| Rumble on the Rock 3
| 
| align=center| 1
| align=center| 2:19
| Hilo, Hawaii, United States
| 
|-
| Win
| align=center| 11–4
| Justin Eilers
| Decision (split)
| SuperBrawl 30: Collision Course
| 
| align=center| 3
| align=center| 5:00
| Honolulu, Hawaii, United States
| 
|-
| Win
| align=center| 10–4
| Sean Alvarez
| TKO (knees and punches)
| UFC 42
| 
| align=center| 2
| align=center| 1:46
| Miami, Florida, United States
| 
|-
| Win
| align=center| 9–4
| Joe Riggs
| KO (knee and punch)
| Rumble on the Rock 1
| 
| align=center| 2
| align=center| 2:07
| Hilo, Hawaii, United States
| 
|-
| Win
| align=center| 8–4
| Jason Lambert
| KO
| SuperBrawl 27
| 
| align=center| 2
| align=center| 1:48
| Honolulu, Hawaii, United States
| Won Icon Sport Heavyweight Championship
|-
| Loss
| align=center| 7–4
| Tim Sylvia
| TKO (corner stoppage)
| UFC 39
| 
| align=center| 2
| align=center| 1:43
| Uncasville, Connecticut, United States
| 
|-
| Win
| align=center| 7–3
| Kauai Kupihea
| TKO
| Force Fighting Championships 1
| 
| align=center| 2
| align=center| 2:53
| Honolulu, Hawaii, United States
| 
|-
| Win
| align=center| 6–3
| Travis Wiuff
| TKO (Submission to knees)
| SuperBrawl 24: Return of the Heavyweights 2
| 
| align=center| 3
| align=center| 1:40
| Honolulu, Hawaii, United States
| 
|-
| Win
| align=center| 5–3
| Kevin Jordan
| TKO (punches)
| SuperBrawl 24: Return of the Heavyweights 1
| 
| align=center| 1
| align=center| 4:28
| Honolulu, Hawaii, United States
| 
|-
| Win
| align=center| 4–3
| Renato Bruzzi
| TKO (punches)
| SuperBrawl 23
| 
| align=center| 2
| align=center| 4:55
| Honolulu, Hawaii, United States
| 
|-
| Win
| align=center| 3–3
| Aaron Brink
| TKO (punches)
| Shogun 1
| 
| align=center| 1
| align=center| 1:08
| Honolulu, Hawaii, United States
| 
|-
| Win
| align=center| 2–3
| Mike Tynanes
| TKO (retirement)
| SuperBrawl 22
| 
| align=center| 2
| align=center| 3:22
| Honolulu, Hawaii, United States
| 
|-
| Win
| align=center| 1–3
| Marcelo Tigre
| DQ (headbutt)
| SuperBrawl 21
| 
| align=center| 2
| align=center| 0:46
| Honolulu, Hawaii, United States
| 
|-
| Loss
| align=center| 0–3
| Preston Hartzog
| Decision (split)
| Superbrawl 19: Futurebrawl 2000
| 
| align=center| 3
| align=center| 5:00
| Honolulu, Hawaii, United States
| 
|-
| Loss
| align=center| 0–2
| Travis Fulton
| Submission (armbar)
| SuperBrawl 18
| 
| align=center| 1
| align=center| 4:49
| Hagåtña, Guam
| 
|-
| Loss
| align=center| 0–1
| Eric Pele
| Submission (armbar)
| Rings USA: Rising Stars Block B
| 
| align=center| 2
| align=center| 2:30
| Honolulu, Hawaii, United States
|

References

External links
 
 

Living people
1978 births
American male kickboxers
Kickboxers from Hawaii
Heavyweight kickboxers
American male mixed martial artists
Mixed martial artists from Hawaii
Heavyweight mixed martial artists
Super heavyweight mixed martial artists
Mixed martial artists utilizing boxing
Mixed martial artists utilizing judo
Mixed martial artists utilizing Brazilian jiu-jitsu
American practitioners of Brazilian jiu-jitsu
American male judoka
People from Hilo, Hawaii
Doping cases in mixed martial arts
American sportspeople in doping cases
Ultimate Fighting Championship male fighters